Aintree University Hospital (colloquially known as Fazakerley Hospital) is a National Health Service hospital in Fazakerley, Liverpool. It is managed by the Liverpool University Hospitals NHS Foundation Trust.

History
In 1898 Liverpool Corporation acquired land from the Harbreck estate with which to build a hospital. The hospital, initially known as the "City Hospital North, Fazakerley, for Infectious Diseases" opened in 1906. During the First World War, the building was requisitioned by the War Office to create the 1st Western General Hospital, a facility for the Royal Army Medical Corps to treat military casualties. It became the "Fazakerley Infectious Hospital" in 1947 and, after joining the National Health Service in 1948, became the Fazakerley Hospital in 1968. The maternity unit was completed in 1969 and, after a major-rebuilding programme, the hospital reopened as the "Fazakerley District General Hospital" in 1974. It became the "University Hospital Aintree" in 1999.

In July 2016 the hospital, together with the Walton Centre, became the single receiving site for major trauma patients in Merseyside. An expanded urgent care and trauma centre was officially opened by the Duke of Cambridge in September 2017.

References

External links
Official site

NHS hospitals in England
Hospital buildings completed in 1906
Hospitals in Liverpool
Buildings and structures in Liverpool
1906 establishments in England